The Bulacan Martyrs of 1982 was a group of young activists who worked together to oppose the Marcos dictatorship and restore democracy in the Philippines. They were meeting at a farmer's residence on June 21, 1982, when the house was raided by 30 armed soldiers from the 175th Philippine Constabulary (PC) Company. They were arrested and were found dead the following day in another town 20 kilometers away.

At the time of their deaths, the Bulacan Martyrs were helping farmers organize themselves to push for the implementation of an agrarian reform program.

The names of these young activists were added in 2012 to the Bantayog ng mga Bayani's Wall of Remembrance.

Background 
A group of young activists were trying to help farmers organize themselves in the province of Bulacan. They were trying to form a local chapter of Alyansa ng Magbubukid sa Gitnang Luson (AMGL), a militant farmers’ alliance based in Central Luzon.

AMGL had organized a series of actions to demand that the government implement an agrarian reform program. AMGL was then a new organization looking for volunteers to help form a chapter in Bulacan. The Philippine military was in control of the province and martial law was in full effect throughout the country under then-president Ferdinand E. Marcos. Bulacan landowners had been using private armies to harass farmers. Organizing was a dangerous activity at the time.

Danilo Aguirre, Edwin Borlongan, Teresita Llorente, Renato Manimbo, and Constantino Medina all volunteered to help organize a Bulacan chapter for AMGL. They had been meeting to evaluate their organizational work and plan a program of action when they were arrested on June 21, 1982, and killed. The bodies of Borlongan and Manimbo were found three days later; the bodies of Aguirre, Llorente, and Medina were found 10 days after the incident. Their bodies all showed heavy bruises and multiple gunshot wounds.

Another companion was able to escape arrest.

Arrest and death 
Details of the arrest and death of the Bulacan Martys were documented by human rights group Task Force Detainees. The members of the group were meeting at a farmer's house when they heard shouts telling them not to move and telling them that the house has been surrounded. Some 30 heavily armed members of the 175th Philippine Constabulary (PC) entered the house. One member of the group climbed out the window and hid himself on the roof. The rest of the group readily surrendered.

The next morning, in San Rafael, a town 20 kilometers away, people found the bodies of the five organizers riddled with bullet holes in a corner of the municipal hall. The PC soldiers said the five were killed in an encounter. Municipal hall employees raised money among themselves to buy caskets for the five and a pair of jeans for the body of the woman who was in pajamas. The bodies were buried that afternoon.

The member of the group who was able to escape went to the victims' relatives and told them of the raid. He still did not know that his companions had been killed. The relatives went to the PC camp and were told that the five organizers were not under their custody. The families learned of the deaths the following day.

Aftermath 
The families of the victims met with the local PC authorities to retrieve the family of their loved ones. The families of Borlongan and Manimbo were given the run-around and complied with several demands, including paying a fee, before they managed to recover the bodies of the two on June 26, five days after the incident. Three days later, the families met with the Malolos diocese bishop Cirilo Almario, Jr., congressman Rogaciano Mercado, and Rev. Edgardo Villacorte to discuss the incident. After providing their testimonies, they implored Bp. Almario and Rev. Villacorte, who was part of the Church-Military Liaison Committee (CMLC) to help them retrieve the bodies and seek the truth by facilitating a dialogue with the local PC unit.

The meeting took place on July 1, and it was attended by the PC's Provincial Commander and Bulacan's Police Superintendent, along with one of the PC captains implicated in the incident. They insisted that what happened was an encounter between the government troops and terrorists. Both sides unmoving in their version of the events, the family opted to request the PC's authorization to have the bodies exhumed. They were redirected to the provincial health officer, then to a municipal judge, before finally being able to retrieve the bodies of the remaining three victims.

By midnight of July 2, ten days after the incident, they were able to place the bodies in sealed coffins for a short period of mourning at the Barasoain Church in Malolos for relatives and sympathizers. Nine priests said mass for the last three bodies that were recovered. The bodies were buried at the Meycauayan Cemetery. Not long after, the AMGL chapter that the Bulacan martyrs formed began to take root in the province. Church and human rights groups in Bulacan began a campaign to press for justice for the slain activists. Despite these efforts, the suspected perpetrators of the killings are not known to have ever been prosecuted. When Benigno Aquino Jr. was assassinated the following year, residents of Bulacan took part in the protest, recalling the recent deaths of the young Bulacan martyrs.

Members 

 Aguirre, Danilo
 Borlongan, Edwin De Guzman
 Llorente, Teresita Evangelista
 Manimbo, Renato Turla
 Medina, Constantino Reyes

See also 
 Bantayog ng mga Bayani
 Workers' resistance against the Marcos dictatorship

References 

 
Filipino activists
History of the Philippines (1965–1986)
Marcos martial law victims
Martial law under Ferdinand Marcos
Political repression in the Philippines
Presidency of Ferdinand Marcos
Assassinated activists